Hong Yuanshuo (31 March 1948 – 1 August 2015) was a Chinese football manager and a former player. Throughout his playing career he spent all of it with Beijing where he won the 1973 league title with them. Since retiring he would move into scouting before moving into management with third-tier club Beijing Kuanli in 1997. By 2009 he would return to his former club as a manager to aid them in their successful push for the 2009 Chinese Super League title.

Player career
At the early 70s, Hong Yuanshuo joined Beijing football team. He played for winger and became the team captain. In 1973, Hong selected by head coach Nian Weisi into the China national football team.

Management career

Early management career
After he retired he was worked in the youth team of Beijing from 1980. In that years he scouts many important player of Beijing Guoan and national team, including Gao Feng, Cao Xiandong, Deng Lejun, Tao Wei and Huang Bowen.

Beijing Kuanli
Hong Yuanshuo was appointed the manager of China League Two club Beijing Kuanli in the 1997 league season. Under Hong Yuanshuo, Beijing Kuanli successfully promoted to Chinese Jia-B League.

Beijing Guoan
After round 23 of the 2009 league season Hong Yuanshuo was appointed as caretaker manager of  Beijing Guoan who required a manager after Lee Jang-Soo left. Finally, Beijing Guoan won the championship of China Super League 2009 without losing any games from round 24 to 30. 

At the beginning of season 2010, Hong officially appointed head coach of Beijing Guoan. He was sacked by the club on 21 September 2010.

Personal life
Hong Yuanshuo is the son of Chinese philosopher Hong Qian (Chinese: 洪谦, 1909–1992).

Death
Hong was diagnosed as colorectal cancer in 2011. He died on 1 August 2015, aged 67.

Honours

Player
Beijing
Chinese Jia-A League: 1973

Manager
Beijing Guoan
China Super League: 2009

References

External links
 Hong Yuanshuo's News
 Profile at bgfc1992's Blog

1943 births
2015 deaths
Chinese footballers
Footballers from Beijing
Chinese football managers
Beijing Guoan F.C. players
China international footballers
Beijing Guoan F.C. managers
Deaths from colorectal cancer
Deaths from cancer in the People's Republic of China
Association football wingers
Chinese Super League managers